Amirgy Pineda (born January 3, 1997) is an American soccer player who currently plays for Chattanooga Red Wolves in USL League One.

Career
Pineda originally committed to play college soccer at Cal State Fullerton, but was academically ineligible. After spending time with the LA Galaxy academy and at Santiago Canyon College, Pineda signed his first professional contract with United Soccer League club Orange County SC. He signed with the club on February 19, 2017.

Pineda joined USL League One side Chattanooga Red Wolves ahead of their inaugural 2019 season.

References

External links
 

1997 births
Living people
American soccer players
Association football midfielders
Orange County SC players
Chattanooga Red Wolves SC players
Soccer players from California
Sportspeople from Santa Ana, California
USL Championship players
USL League One players
Junior college men's soccer players in the United States